Leucania herrichii is a species of moth of the family Noctuidae. It is found in Bulgaria, Greece, Turkey, Israel, Lebanon, Syria, Jordan the Levant, Iran and Turkmenistan.

Adults are on wing from August to November. There is one generation per year.

The larvae probably feed on various Gramineae species.

External links
 Hadeninae of Israel

Leucania
Moths of the Middle East
Moths described in 1849